Wonderstruck is a Canadian children's television series that aired on CBC Television. It was hosted by Bob McDonald.

External links
 Profile of Wonderstruck
 IMDb
CBC Television original programming
1980s Canadian children's television series
1990s Canadian children's television series